Class 801 may refer to:

British Rail Class 801, electric multiple unit train
CIE 801 Class, diesel locomotive train engine
FS ALe 801 power cars for the FS Class ALe 801/940 electric multiple unit trains

See also

 801 (disambiguation)